PFR is a Christian rock group from Minneapolis, Minnesota. Although the group initially disbanded in 1997, they  periodically reunited from 2001 to 2013 and recorded two albums in that time. They reunited again in 2022 for two shows near Minneapolis with another show scheduled in Nashville in March 2023. Their name was originally "Pray for Rain", but was changed to "PFR" to avoid a conflict with another musical group.

History
PFR was founded in 1989 as the Joel Hanson Band by Joel Hanson, who was a camp counselor at Camp Shamineau, a Christian youth camp in Minnesota. In 1991, the band, then known as Inside Out, was signed to Brown Bannister's newly founded Vireo Records. After signing, Patrick Andrew suggested the band change the name to "Pray for Rain" after a line from a poem. In 1992, the band released Pray for Rain, and gained some attention with the song "Do You Want to Know Love". Shortly after releasing the first album, an existing band (an instrumental group who did soundtrack work) known as Pray for Rain threatened a lawsuit, leading the band to settle on the name PFR. The first album was reissued with a slightly modified cover to reflect the change.

In 1993, PFR released their second album, Goldie's Last Day, whose title track was inspired by the passing of Patrick Andrew's pet golden retriever. Also that year, the band recorded a cover of "We Can Work It Out" by The Beatles with guitar legend Phil Keaggy for the various artists tribute CD Come Together: America Salutes The Beatles. 

PFR released their third album, Great Lengths in 1994. The album had the band's biggest hit, "The Love I Know", inspired by I Corinthians 13. The Great Lengths tour introduced a new band, Jars of Clay, who would become one of the most popular Christian groups to date, also enjoying great mainstream success.

Having changed musical direction with each album, PFR moved into an edgier, heavy sound for 1996's Them. While the album was well-received, the band shortly afterward announced that they were splitting up. In 1997, The Late Great PFR was released, a greatest hits album containing three new songs, with one ("Forever") becoming a Christian radio hit.

Over the next 5 years, the band reunited for an occasional benefit concert. In 2000, when Mark Nash was working as the A & R director of Squint Records, the band returned to the studio to contribute to Steve Taylor's Roaring Lambs project, inspired by the book by Bob Briner. Working on the project inspired the band to sign to Taylor's Squint Records, and record 2001's Disappear. The album did not gain much exposure, however, due to Squint Records selling to another company, which also displaced artists such as Chevelle and Sixpence None the Richer. Another casualty of the Squint shakeup was the PFR cover of Paul McCartney's "Wonderful Christmastime" recorded for a 2001 Squint Christmas compilation that was never released.  However, the recording has been released digitally through the band's MySpace page. In 2002, PFR recorded a cover of "Livin' Thing", originally by Electric Light Orchestra.

In 2004 PFR released The Bookhouse Recordings, an album chiefly consisting of PFR classics rearranged, plus three new songs. The Bookhouse Recordings was recorded in one week at the end of August 2004 in Nashville, TN at Mark Nash's studio. This was the first album produced by the band alone, and features the song "Prayer For Beslan," a song mourning the terrorist attacks on a Russian school the same week the band was recording.The Bookhouse Recordings was released exclusively through Family Christian Stores, and was on the FUSEIC label started by Rick Altizer. Altizer now fronts the band Dum Dog Run with Jade Hanson, Joel Hanson's older brother.

Joel Hanson released three solo albums, Broken (2001), Captured (2002) and "What If It Is" (2009). Patrick Andrew formed Eager following the 1997 break-up of PFR, and was signed to Quaestar Mission Records, releasing a self-titled album in 1998, before Eager also disbanded. In 2004, Patrick Andrew released his first solo album, There and Then It's Gone.

In 2012, PFR reunited for the "PFR Twelve in 2012" tour.  Their first show was at Joel's home church, The Church of the Open Door, in Minneapolis-St. Paul, Minnesota on January 27, 2012. In December 2012, PFR released a 13-track, live album entitled "Minneapolis". This album was made available exclusively as a digital download.

In 2013, PFR played the main stage at the Sonshine Festival in Willmar, Minnesota. A Kickstarter project was announced later in the year on October 2, set to release on October 16. Technical problems kept the project from being released on time and, instead, another surprise was released on their Facebook page. Joel Hanson announced on October 16, 2013 that the band had once again disbanded. He cited "personal things" with one of the band's members, and stated that these issues "need attention far more than our band does." No further details were given and the Kickstarter project was cancelled.

PFR reunited for two shows in the autumn of 2022.

Members
Joel Hanson – guitar, vocals
Patrick Andrew – bass guitar, vocals
Mark Nash – drums

Discography

Studio albums

 Pray for Rain (1992, Vireo)
 Goldie's Last Day (1993, Vireo)
 Great Lengths (1994, Vireo)
 Them (1996, Vireo)
 The Late Great PFR (1998, Vireo) compilation with three new songs
 Disappear (2001, Squint)
 The Bookhouse Recordings (2004, Fuseic) rearranged songs with three new songs
 Minneapolis (2012) digital download only; live recording

Compilation appearances

 Come Together: America Salutes The Beatles (1995, Capitol)
 Roaring Lambs (2000, Squint)
 Lynne Me Your Ears: A Tribute to Jeff Lynne (2002, Not Lame)
 Very Best of PFR (2006, Sparrow) compilation

References

External links
PFR at Jesus Freak Hideout
PFR on Facebook

American Christian musical groups
Musical groups from Nashville, Tennessee
Musical groups established in 1991
1991 establishments in Tennessee